Josias Hartmann (3 April 1893 – 29 October 1982) was a Swiss sport shooter who competed in the 1924 Summer Olympics. In 1924 he won the bronze medal in the 50 metre rifle, prone competition.

References

External links
profile

1982 deaths
1893 births
Swiss male sport shooters
ISSF rifle shooters
Olympic shooters of Switzerland
Shooters at the 1924 Summer Olympics
Olympic bronze medalists for Switzerland
Olympic medalists in shooting
Medalists at the 1924 Summer Olympics
Sportspeople from Graubünden